Shane Carruth (born 1972) is an American filmmaker, screenwriter, composer, and actor. He is the writer, director, and co-star of the prize-winning science-fiction film Primer (2004), which was his debut feature. His second film, Upstream Color (2013), was an experimental science-fiction film which he wrote, directed, produced, edited, designed, and starred in. He also composed the scores for both films. In recognition of Carruth's idiosyncratic and, at times, bizarre filmmaking technique, director Steven Soderbergh told Entertainment Weekly, "I view Shane as the illegitimate offspring of David Lynch and James Cameron."

Early life
Carruth was born in Myrtle Beach, South Carolina in 1972. He attended Stephen F. Austin State University as a mathematics major. Before becoming a filmmaker, he worked as a developer of flight-simulation software.

Career

Primer 

For his independent film Primer, Carruth wrote, directed, produced, and performed one of the two main roles; he also composed the score. The film was honored at the 2004 Sundance Film Festival with the Grand Jury Prize and the Alfred P. Sloan Award. Carruth, a former software engineer with an undergraduate degree in mathematics, used his technical knowledge extensively on the project.

Upstream Color 
On January 21, 2013, Carruth premiered his film Upstream Color at the 2013 Sundance Film Festival in the U.S. Dramatic Competition category. Carruth, Johnny Marshall, and Pete Horner won the U.S. Dramatic Special Jury Award for Sound Design for the film. Keith Kimbell wrote that it was the "most anticipated (and most difficult to describe) film in competition", and "most critics couldn't stop talking about it". The film was released via VHX on April 5, 2013. Some of Carruth's music from Upstream Color was featured in the 2016 documentary Tickled.

Unrealized or upcoming work 
In 2009, David Sullivan, one of the leads in Primer, tweeted that "Shane Carruth's next project, A Topiary, is in the early stages of pre-production". Filmmaker Rian Johnson tweeted that it would feature a "mind-blowing sci-fi script." In 2010, several news sources reported that A Topiary was in the works and that the script had been written. There was already a website for the movie which, according to Carruth in an interview to io9, "The website for now is just a place mark as financing has yet to be completed. I'm cautiously optimistic that this can happen soon and couldn't be happier with the filmmakers that have committed to the project so far." However, the film (which Entertainment Weekly described as "a sci-fi epic about a group of kids who build a giant, animal-like creature") stalled, and in early 2013, Carruth told EW that it was "the thing I basically wasted my whole life on." Carruth no longer pursues the project; some VFX test footage of the film is visible in Upstream Color in a scene when a character is examining the video for technical flaws.

In 2014, Carruth announced a new film, The Modern Ocean, based on international shipping and the lives of those involved. On August 12, 2015, it was reported that the film was in pre-production, and its ensemble cast was announced in November 2015; it would include Jeff Goldblum, Anne Hathaway, Keanu Reeves, Tom Holland, Daniel Radcliffe, Chloë Grace Moretz, Asa Butterfield, and Abraham Attah. In an interview in 2018, Carruth noted that the film is "not gonna happen anytime soon". Irrfan Khan was also scheduled to star as the lead captain of the ship, before his death on April 29, 2020. On June 17, 2020, Carruth posted the entire script for The Modern Ocean on Twitter, along with some of the original score.

In 2019, in an interview Carruth claimed he was working on "a massive thing" and would leave the film industry once that project concludes.

Consulting 
Carruth was rumored to have consulted on time-travel sequences for filmmaker Rian Johnson's Looper, though it was later revealed that those sequences were deemed too expensive to shoot.

Acting 

In 2018, Carruth starred in the psychological thriller The Dead Center about a hospital psychiatrist whose own sanity is pushed to the edge when a frightened amnesiac patient insists that he has died and brought something terrible back from the other side.

Personal life 
From 2011 to 2018, Carruth was in a relationship with Amy Seimetz. The couple became engaged in 2013. Seimetz obtained temporary restraining orders against Carruth in 2018 and 2020 and a permanent restraining order in 2020, citing years of domestic and emotional abuse and harassment. Carruth has denied these allegations.

On January 13, 2022, Carruth was arrested at the home of another ex-girlfriend on allegations of domestic assault and vandalism. He was released four days later on a $50,000 bond.

In 2019, when asked about his religious beliefs, he stated that he was raised Christian, but fell away from it, before later saying that he still prays from time to time and finds some comfort from the Bible.

Filmography

Television

Acting roles

Other credits

Awards and nominations

References

External links
 

Interviews
 A Primer Primer, By Dennis Lim Tuesday, October 5, 2004, New York – Village Voice
 Interview with Primer director Shane Carruth , October 3, 2004, sffworld.com

1972 births
Living people
American male film actors
American film producers
American male screenwriters
Science fiction film directors
People from Myrtle Beach, South Carolina
Sundance Film Festival award winners
Alfred P. Sloan Prize winners
Stephen F. Austin State University alumni
Film directors from South Carolina
Screenwriters from South Carolina